Patrick Butler (born 1 December 1990) is an Irish rugby union player, who currently plays for Japanese Rugby League One club Mie Honda Heat. He can play as either a flanker or number 8.

Early years
He was the captain of Rockwell College in the Munster Senior Cup in 2008, having also played senior schools rugby in 2007.

Professional career

Munster
Butler joined the Munster senior squad on a development contract after being promoted from an academy contract for the 2010–11 season. He made his debut against Connacht on 27 December 2010. He won the Man-of-the-Match award in the 2011–12 British and Irish Cup Final, helping Munster A to a 31–12 win over Cross Keys.

He made his Heineken Cup debut on 13 October 2012, in Munster's opening fixture away to Racing Métro 92. Butler agreed a contract extension with Munster in January 2013. He scored his first try for Munster on 19 April 2013, in a Pro12 fixture against Newport Gwent Dragons.

Butler suffered a broken thumb during Munster's game against Edinburgh in October 2013, ruling him out for 8–10 weeks. He returned from the injury in Munster's game against Connacht on 27 December 2013.

Butler scored the winning try in Munster's 28–24 away win against Cardiff Blues on 1 November 2014. On 30 January 2015, it was announced that Butler would leave Munster at the end of the 2014–15 season, after deciding not to renew his contract.

Section Paloise
Butler joined French Top 14 side Pau ahead of the 2015–16 season, and left the club upon the conclusion of the 2018–19 season, returning to Ireland and joining up with the Munster pre-season training squad, albeit on a non-contract basis.

Yamaha Júbilo
Butler joined Japanese Top League side Yamaha Júbilo on a two-year contract in January 2020.

Mie Honda Heat
Butler moved to Mie Honda Heat, who also play in the Japanese Rugby League One, ahead of the commencement of the 2022 season in January of that year.

Ireland
He has represented Ireland at underage levels up to under-20. Butler played for Ireland at the Under-20 Rugby World Cup in Argentina in June 2010. Butler previously played for Ireland U-18. He was called into the senior Ireland squad for their warm-up game against the Barbarians on 29 May 2012 in Gloucester.

Butler was selected in the Emerging Ireland squad on 26 May 2014. He started in their second game against Uruguay on 18 June 2014, scoring two tries. Butler came off the bench in the 31–10 win against Romania on 22 June 2014, a win that secured the 2014 IRB Nations Cup for Emerging Ireland.

Honours

Emerging Ireland
IRB Nations Cup
Winner (1): (2014)

References

External links
Munster Profile
U20 Six Nations Profile

1990 births
Living people
People educated at Rockwell College
Irish rugby union players
Shannon RFC players
Munster Rugby players
Section Paloise players
Shizuoka Blue Revs players
Mie Honda Heat players
Expatriate rugby union players in Japan
Irish expatriate rugby union players
Irish expatriate sportspeople in Japan
Rugby union flankers
Rugby union number eights